Kindleinwiegen (Rocking the Christchild) is a Christian Nativity tradition which can be traced back to the Liturgical dramas of the later Medieval period.   It is a tradition primarily from the German speaking parts of central Europe which appeared across the region in a variety of forms, chiefly though not exclusively in monasteries and churches.  It was at its most widespread between the fifteenth and nineteenth centuries, and survived more strongly in Roman Catholic regions than in those areas that switched to protestantism, following the interventions of Martin Luther and others.

German language terms used for  the celebration include Christkindlwiegen:  the verb included in that compound word, "wiegen", indicates both rocking/cradling and weighing/getting the measure of the baby.

The celebration involved a form of congregational dancing accompanied by singing around a picture of Jesus placed on a crib or adjacent altar.   The performance was led by the priests, and the singing, at least initially, appears to have consisted of duet sung by two priests.
The ceremony is still carried out, believed now to be uniquely, in the parish church of St Mary of the Purification, Blidworth, Nottinghamshire, England, usually on the nearest Sunday to Candlemas (although if that Sunday falls in January it is usually enacted on the following Sunday, so that it is always the first Sunday in February. It was restored at Blidworth in 1922 so the service which took place on 6th February 2022 marked the centenary of its restoration. For more details search Blidworth Rocking.

History
The first surviving record of a "Kindelwiegenfeier" appears in "De investigatione Antichristi", produced in 1161/62 by Gerhoh, the Provost of the Augustinian Cannons at the Monastery of Reichersberg in Upper Austria.   According to Gerhoh's description, the location of the ceremony was a monastery church and the participants were monks or "secular" clerics.   The ceremony comprised the singing of several songs, from the book of hours and other unspecified liturgical sources, enriched with various drama-actions by the participants.   In later centuries a wider level of congregation participation became the norm.

Reformation
By the fifteenth century the custom had spread to practically all the churches in Germany. During the sixteenth century it began to be rejected by the more hardline protestant congregations, however, which increasingly rejected the "Child Rocking" ceremony as one of the fruits of ("papist") superstition. Nevertheless, even in regions touched by the Protestant Reformation it took a long time for Christkindlwiegen to disappear entirely.

Bach biographer Philipp Spitta describes the customs regarding the Kindleinwiegen in Protestant Leipzig before and after the City Council formally abolished the practice in 1702. He starts with a comment on a hymn in German that also uses some Latin words (Virga Jesse floruit, as used by the Leipzig composers Kuhnau and Bach for their Christmas compositions):

Counter reformation
There was throughout the centuries considerable variation concerning the details of the ceremony.   Even in regions that remained staunchly catholic, as the Counter reformation took hold there was a reaction against some of the Medieval jollity of the earlier celebrations, and the image of Jesus tended to be removed from the crib and placed instead on the altar, which was felt to be more respectful.

There was also increasingly use of "props" such as a Santa Claus doll to supervise proceedings.   In another version, each of the young girls from the village dressed up and brought to church their own wax doll of the Baby Jesus.   This provides a link to the Christmas nativity scene centred on the crib that became popular in the nineteenth century and remains a focus of Christmas decoration in many churches today.  Another surviving link from the Christkindlwiegen custom is the Christmas song , still popular in German speaking areas, and believed to have originated as one of the songs that would have accompanied the old ceremony.

Revival
Although the  Christkindlwiegen had generally fallen out of use by the start of the twentieth century, there have been revivals.   On January 7, 2012 the Viennese Medieval music expert Eberhard Kummer marked the 850th anniversary of the ceremony's first surviving recorded mention with a revival performance in St Gertrude's Church at Klosterneuburg, a short distance upstream of Vienna.  Proceedings involved two altar girls rocking the "Christchild" in his crib, to the accompaniment of authentic dancing.   The ceremony took place again at Klosterneuburg in January 2013 and January 2014.

References

Sources
 Spitta, Philipp. "Fünftes Buch: Leipziger Jahre von 1723—1734" in Johann Sebastian Bach, Zweiter Band. Breitkopf & Härtel, 1880.
"Fünftes Buch: Leipziger Jahre von 1723—1734" pp. 3-479 in Johann Sebastian Bach, Zweiter Band. Dritte unveränderte Auflage, Leipzig: Breitkopf & Härtel, 1921.
"Book V: Leipzig, 1723-1734" pp. 181-648 in Johann Sebastian Bach: his work and influence on the music of Germany, 1685–1750, translated by Clara Bell and John Alexander Fuller-Maitland, In Three Volumes, Vol. II. London, Novello & Co, 1884.

Christianity in Germany
Christmas in Germany